The white-eared brown dove (Phapitreron leucotis) is a species of bird in the family Columbidae. It is endemic to the Philippines.

Description
Adult individuals have a black sub-ocular line starting from the gape to the nape (McGregor, 1909) followed by a white line from the posterior border of the eye to the nape (Carino, 2009; McGregor, 1909). In general, these birds have brown feathers but the crown is pale gray and the chin and upper throat is tawny (Baptista et al., 2017). In addition, lower breast and abdomen are slightly pale yellow which is much paler than the posterior part, the under tail-coverts are dark pearl-gray and the wings are brown with the primaries having pale edges, and the rectrices each having a wide gray band on the terminal end (McGregor, 1909). These birds are also characterized by short bills (Carino, 2009; Hachisuka, 1941), and greenish bronze collar (Carino, 2009; McGregor, 1909) or green or blue iridescence on the nape (P. Simpson, pers. Commun., September 11, 2017).

References

white-eared brown dove
white-eared brown dove
Taxonomy articles created by Polbot